Reinhard Lauck (16 September 1946 – 22 October 1997), often nicknamed Mäcki, was a German footballer who played as a midfielder.

Club career 
Lauck played for Union Berlin (1968–1973) and BFC Dynamo (1973–1981) in more than 250 East German top-flight matches. Lauck was voted the 1974 and 1976 BFC Footballer of the Year at the 9th and 10th editions of the club's traditional annual ball in the Dynamo-Sporthalle at the beginning of the new year. He led BFC Dynamo to win three East German championships in a row, the first three of overall ten consecutive league titles for the Wine Reds.

International career 
On the national level he played for East Germany national team (30 matches/three goals), and was a participant at the 1974 FIFA World Cup. During the 1974 World Cup, Lauck excelled in the famous 1–0 victory of his East Germany side over later world champion West Germany.

Honours
BFC Dynamo
 DDR-Oberliga: 1979, 1980, 1981

East Germany
 Summer Olympics gold medalist: 1976

References

External links
 
 
 
 

1946 births
1997 deaths
Sportspeople from Cottbus
German footballers
East German footballers
Footballers from Brandenburg
Association football midfielders
1974 FIFA World Cup players
Footballers at the 1976 Summer Olympics
Olympic footballers of East Germany
Olympic gold medalists for East Germany
1. FC Union Berlin players
Berliner FC Dynamo players
FC Energie Cottbus players
East Germany international footballers
Olympic medalists in football
DDR-Oberliga players
Medalists at the 1976 Summer Olympics